The 1937–38 Montreal Canadiens season was the team's 29th season of play. The Canadiens placed third in the Canadian Division and qualified for the playoffs. Montreal met and lost to the eventual Stanley Cup champion Chicago Black Hawks in the quarter-finals.

Regular season
A Morenz Benefit All-Star game was held at the Forum on November 2, 1937. 8,683 fans attended, contributing $11,447 to a total pot of over $20,000 for Howie Morenz's family.

This was the last season for Pit Lepine, Aurel Joliat and Marty Burke. Burke had returned from Chicago in a trade for Bill MacKenzie.

Final standings

Record vs. opponents

Schedule and results

Playoffs
The Canadiens drew the third-place finisher of the American division, the Chicago Blackhawks. Montreal lost the best-of-three series 2–1.

Player statistics

Regular season
Scoring

Goaltending

Playoffs
Scoring

Goaltending

European tour

After losing in the playoffs, the Canadiens embarked on a tour of Europe with the Detroit Red Wings. Prior to departure, the two teams played three exhibition games in Nova Scotia. In Europe, the teams played a nine-game series in England and France. The Canadiens won the series with a record of 5–3–1

Awards and records
 Toe Blake – NHL Second All-Star team
 Babe Siebert – NHL First All-Star team

Transactions

See also
1937–38 NHL season

References

Notes

Montreal Canadiens seasons
Montreal Canadiens
Montreal Canadiens